Todd Torres (born June 11, 1968) is a former international breaststroke and freestyle swimmer from Puerto Rico, who participated in two consecutive Summer Olympics starting in 1992.

His best Olympic result was a 12th place in the Men's  Freestyle Relay at the 1992 Summer Olympics in Barcelona, Spain. Torres also competed for the United States, winning a gold and a silver medal at the 1987 Summer Universiade in Zagreb.

Torres swam collegiately for Louisiana State University (LSU). At LSU, he was a 14-time All American and won a national and Southeastern Conference (SEC) championship in 1987. Torres also won another SEC Championship in the 200-yard breaststroke in 1988. In 2015 Swimmer Todd Torres was inducted to the Louisiana State University Athletic Hall of Fame and in 2019 was inducted to the North Carlolina Swimming Hall of Fame.

References

1968 births
Living people
Puerto Rican male swimmers
Puerto Rican male freestyle swimmers
Male breaststroke swimmers
Swimmers at the 1991 Pan American Games
Swimmers at the 1992 Summer Olympics
Swimmers at the 1995 Pan American Games
Swimmers at the 1996 Summer Olympics
Olympic swimmers of Puerto Rico
Place of birth missing (living people)
Pan American Games silver medalists for Puerto Rico
Pan American Games medalists in swimming
Universiade medalists in swimming
Central American and Caribbean Games gold medalists for Puerto Rico
Competitors at the 1990 Central American and Caribbean Games
Universiade gold medalists for the United States
Central American and Caribbean Games medalists in swimming
Medalists at the 1987 Summer Universiade
Medalists at the 1991 Pan American Games